Ernst von Glasersfeld (March 8, 1917, Munich – November 12, 2010, Leverett, Franklin County, Massachusetts) was a philosopher, and emeritus professor of psychology at the University of Georgia, research associate at the Scientific Reasoning Research Institute, and adjunct professor in the Department of Psychology at the University of Massachusetts Amherst. He was a member of the board of trustees of the American Society for Cybernetics, from which he received the McCulloch Memorial Award in 1991. He was a member of the scientific board of the Instituto Piaget, Lisbon. Glasersfeld is known for the development of radical constructivism.

Biography
Glasersfeld was born in Munich, where his father, Leopold, worked as a cultural attaché in Vienna before going into photography after World War I. He was a student of mathematics at the University of Vienna before having to move out because of the Nazi threat, considering that his Pan-European family (they subscribed to the ideology of Richard von Coudenhove-Kalergi) was known to be "enemies of any form of nationalism" and his grandfather was Jewish (a convert to Roman Catholicism). 

The younger Glaserfeld thus spent large parts of his life in Ireland (1940s), in Italy (1950s) where he worked with Silvio Ceccato, and in the United States. He graduated from Lyceum Alpinum Zuoz, a Swiss boarding school. He studied and elaborated upon the work of  Giambattista Vico, Jean Piaget's genetic epistemology, Bishop Berkeley's theory of perception, James Joyce's Finnegans Wake, and other important texts. Von Glasersfeld developed his model of radical constructivism, which is an ethos shared by all of these writers to one degree or another.

The Ernst von Glasersfeld Archive, part of the Research Institute Brenner-Archiv at the University of Innsbruck, maintains the literary estate and also organizes the Ernst von Glasersfeld Lectures. The literary executors are Theo Hug and Josef Mitterer.

On the occasion of Ernst von Glasersfeld's 100th birthday in 2017, the international conference "Radical Constructivism – Past, Present and Future" took place at the University of Innsbruck.

Honors and awards
 1991: Warren McCulloch Memorial Award of the American Society for Cybernetics
 1997: Honorary doctorate of the University of Klagenfurt
 2002: Reconnaissance du Mérite scientifique of the University of Quebec
 2005: The Wiener Gold Medal of the American Society for Cybernetics
 2005: Gregory Bateson-award of the Heidelberg Institute for Systemic Research e.V.
 2007: Journal of Constructivist Foundations honoured him on his 90th birthday with a Festschrift Glasersfeld
 2007: Austrian Cross of Honour for Science and Art, 1st class
 2008: Honorary doctorate of the University of Innsbruck
 2009: Honorary Medal of the City of Vienna in gold

Selected publications
Glasersfeld, E. von, (2001) The radical constructivist view of science. In: A. Riegler (Ed.), Foundations of Science, special issue on "The Impact of Radical Constructivism on Science", vol.6, no. 1–3: 31–43.
Glasersfeld, E. von (1989). “Cognition, Construction of Knowledge and Teaching.” Synthese, 80(1),121-140.
Glasersfeld, E. von (1990). “Environment and Communication.” In L.P. Steffe & T. Wood (eds.), Transforming Children’s Mathematics Education: International Perspectives, (pp. 30–38). Hillsdale, NJ: Lawrence Erlbaum.
Glasersfeld, E. von (1992). “Questions and Answers About Radical Constructivism.” In M.K. Pearsall (ed.), Scope, Sequence, and Coordination of Secondary Schools Science, Vol. 11, Relevant Research, (pp. 169–182). Washington DC: NSTA.

See also
 Yerkish

References

Further reading
Hugh Gash and Alexander Riegler (eds.) (2011) Commemorative Issue for Ernst von Glasersfeld. Special Issue, Constructivist Foundations 6(2): 135-253, freely available at the journal's web site

External links

 Ernst-von-Glasersfeld-Archive 
 Ernst von Glasersfeld
 Biography of Ernst von Glasersfeld
 Ernst von Glasersfeld Digital Archive

1927 births
2010 deaths
Educational psychologists
Epistemologists
German people of Austrian-Jewish descent
20th-century German philosophers
Writers from Munich
Giambattista Vico scholars
James Joyce scholars
Emigrants from Nazi Germany to the United States
Recipients of the Austrian Cross of Honour for Science and Art, 1st class
University of Georgia faculty
21st-century German philosophers
Alumni of Lyceum Alpinum Zuoz